Seyyed Zahrav (also Romanized as Seyyed Z̧ahrāv; also known as Seyyed Z̧ahrāb) is a village in Elhayi Rural District, in the Central District of Ahvaz County, Khuzestan Province, Iran. At the 2006 census, its population was 34, in 5 families.

References 

Populated places in Ahvaz County